Proligestone, sold under the brand names Covinan and Delvosteron, is a progestin medication which is used in veterinary medicine.

Uses

Veterinary
Proligestone is used to control estrus in dogs and cats and has also been used to treat hypersexuality in dogs and cats.

Pharmacology

Pharmacodynamics
Proligestone is a progestogen, or an agonist of the progesterone receptor (PR).

Chemistry

Proligestone, also known as 14α,17α-propylidenedioxyprogesterone or as 14α,17α-dihydroxyprogesterone cyclic acetal with propionaldehyde, as well as 14α,17α-propylidenedioxypregn-4-ene-3,20-dione, is a synthetic pregnane steroid and a derivative of progesterone and 17α-hydroxyprogesterone. It is a C14α,17α cyclic ketal of 14α,17α-dihydroxyprogesterone.

History
Proligestone was described as early as 1968 and was introduced for veterinary use in 1975.

Society and culture

Generic names

Brand names
Proligestone is marketed under the brand names Covinan and Delvosteron.

Availability
Proligestone is or has been available for veterinary use in Argentina, Australia, Austria, Belgium, Czechoslovakia, France, Germany, Ireland, Italy, the Netherlands, New Zealand, Poland, South Africa, Switzerland, and the United Kingdom.

References

Cyclic acetals with aldehydes
Diketones
Diols
Pregnanes
Progestogens
Steroid cyclic ketals
Veterinary drugs